William Phillips Talbot (June 7, 1915 – October 1, 2010) was a United States Ambassador to Greece (1965–69) and, at his death, member of the American Academy of Diplomacy, the Council of American Ambassadors and the Council on Foreign Relations.

Early life
Talbot was born in Pittsburgh, Pennsylvania and served in the United States Navy during World War II.

Career

Journalism
After graduating from the University of Illinois in 1936, Talbot started as a reporter for the Chicago Daily News, where he remained from 1936 to 1938. In 1939, having been turned down for a foreign correspondent position, he left the Chicago Daily News to take a position with the Institute of Current World Affairs in India where he reported on the Indian independence movement. The Phillips Talbot Fellowship was named in his honor and is awarded yearly by the Institute to promising young journalists.

Politics

Talbot was the United States Assistant Secretary of State for Near Eastern and South Asian affairs from 1961-65 during the Kennedy and Johnson administrations.

Talbot served as President of Asia Society from 1970-1982 and was awarded the Padma Shri in March 2002 for his efforts in fomenting peace between India and America during his tenure as President.

References

External links
Phillips Talbot Papers 1915-1968

1915 births
2010 deaths
Writers from Pittsburgh
University of Illinois alumni
Ambassadors of the United States to Greece
United States Navy personnel of World War II
Place of death missing
Greek junta
Recipients of the Padma Shri in public affairs